Several buildings carry the HSBC name, and some are often referred to as HSBC Building, HSBC Tower or both:

Building
 HSBC Building (Hong Kong) - 1 Queen's Road Central, Victoria City, Hong Kong
 HSBC Building Mongkok - 673 Nathan Road, Kowloon, Hong Kong
 HSBC Building, the Bund - neo-classical landmark on The Bund, Shanghai, China
 HSBC Canada Building - Vancouver, British Columbia, Canada
 Marine Midland Building - 140 Broadway, New York City, US (also called HSBC Building)
 One Centenary Square - Birmingham, United Kingdom - headquarters of HSBC UK

Tower
 Menara IQ, Tun Razak Exchange, Kuala Lumpur, Malaysia
 HSBC Tower, London - 8 Canada Square, in the Canary Wharf development, Isle of Dogs, London, UK
 HSBC Tower, Shanghai - Forty-six-floor tower in Lujiazui, Pudong, Shanghai, China
 HSBC Tower, Mexico City - Paseo de la Reforma, Mexico City, Mexico
 HSBC Tower, Midtown Manhattan (USA Headquarters) - 452 Fifth Ave., Manhattan, New York City, US

Other
 HSBC Arena (Buffalo) - Buffalo, New York, US
 HSBC Arena (Rio de Janeiro) - Rio de Janeiro, Brazil
 HSBC Centre - Kowloon, Hong Kong
 HSBC GLT India - Global Technology Center in Pune, India
 HSBC Tower - 188 Quay Street, Auckland, New Zealand
 One HSBC Center - Buffalo, New York, US
 One HSBC Plaza - Rochester, New York, US
 One HSBC Plaza - Binghamton, New York, US